The Florida East Coast League was the name of two American minor league baseball circuits based on the Atlantic coast of Florida. The first edition of the league operated as a Class D level league from 1940 to 1942. The league reformed for the 1972 season as a Rookie level league before folding.

History

The first incarnation of the FECL was as a Class D circuit that played from  through May 14, . It shut its doors, along with many other minor leagues, a few months after the United States entered World War II, and, despite the postwar baseball boom, it was not revived.

The second Florida East Coast League was a Rookie-class "complex league" owned and operated by Major League Baseball clubs. It existed for one season —  — and was intended to provide a second Florida-based league for 18- and 19-year-old players, along with the established Gulf Coast League, which was then concentrated along the west coast of Florida. The FECL of 1972 featured four teams based at minor league training complexes in Cocoa and Melbourne.

FECL teams, 1940–1942

 Cocoa Beach Fliers
 DeLand Red Hats
 Fort Lauderdale Tarpons (champions, 1940)
 Fort Pierce Bombers
 Hollywood Chiefs
 Miami Beach Flamingos (champions, 1941)

 Miami Beach Tigers
 Miami Seminoles
 Miami Wahoos
 Orlando Senators 
 West Palm Beach Indians

FECL teams, 1972
 Cocoa Astros
 Cocoa Expos 
 Melbourne Reds (champions)
 Melbourne Twins

Standings & statistics

1940 to 1942
1940 Florida East Coast League
Playoffs: Ft. Lauderdale 3 games, West Palm Beach 1; Miami Beach 3 games, Hollywood 0.Finals: Ft. Lauderdale 4 games, Miami Beach 1. 
 
1941 Florida East Coast League
Playoffs: Miami Beach 3 games, Fort Pierce 1;West Palm Beach 3 games, Ft. Lauderdale 2.Finals: Miami Beach 4 games, West Palm Beach 2. 

 
1942 Florida East Coast League
schedule 
Playoffs: None Scheduled. Cocoa disbanded April 21; Ft. Lauderdale disbanded May 14.The league disbanded May 14.

1972
1972 Florida East Coast League
Total league attendance, 966 No playoffs Scheduled.

References

Johnson, Lloyd and Wolff, Miles, eds., The Encyclopedia of Minor League Baseball, 3d edition. Durham, N.C.: Baseball America, 2007.

Defunct minor baseball leagues in the United States
Baseball leagues in Florida
1940 establishments in Florida
1942 disestablishments in Florida
1972 establishments in Florida
1972 disestablishments in Florida
Sports leagues established in 1940
Sports leagues disestablished in 1942
Sports leagues established in 1972
Sports leagues disestablished in 1972